The Border and Maritime Security Division (BMD) is a division of the Science and Technology Directorate of the United States Department of Homeland Security. Within the Homeland Security Advanced Research Projects Agency, BMD develops tools and technologies that improve the security of the United States's land borders and waterways.

Focus
The 2007 High Priority Technical Needs Brochure published by Homeland Security defines critical focus areas for Border and Maritime research, falling primarily under the categories of border security, cargo security and maritime security.

Border security
 Improved ballistic protection via personal protective equipment
 Improve detection, tracking, and identification of all threats along the terrestrial and maritime border
 Non-lethal compliance measures for vehicles, vessels, or aircraft allowing for safe interdiction by law enforcement personnel
 Non-destructive tools that allow for the inspection of hidden or closed compartments to find contraband or security threats
 Improved analysis and decision-making tools that will ensure the development/implementation of border security initiatives
 Ability for law enforcement personnel to quickly identify the origin of gunfire and classify the type of weapon fired
 Ability for law enforcement officers to assure compliance of lawful orders using non-lethal means

Cargo security
 Enhanced screening and examination by non-intrusive inspection
 Increased information fusion, anomaly detection, Automatic Target Recognition capability
 Detect and identify WMD materials and contraband
 Capability to screen 100% of air cargo
 Test the feasibility of seal security; Detection of intrusion
 Track domestic high-threat cargo
 Harden air cargo conveyances and containers
 Positive ID of cargo & detection

Maritime security
 Wide-area surveillance from the coast to beyond the horizon; port and inland waterways region - detect, ID, and track
 Data fusion and automated tools for command center operations
 Vessel compliance through non-lethal compliance methods
 Enhanced capability to continuously track contraband on ships or containers
 Improved ballistic personal protective equipment for officer safety
 Improved WMD detection equipment for officer safety; improved screening capability for WMD for maritime security checkpoints

References

Border and Maritime Security Division
Water transportation in the United States